WKCF (channel 18) is a television station licensed to Clermont, Florida, United States, serving the Orlando area as an affiliate of The CW. It is owned by Hearst Television alongside Daytona Beach–licensed NBC affiliate WESH (channel 2). Both stations share studios on North Wymore Road in Eatonville (with a Winter Park address), while WKCF's transmitter is located in unincorporated Bithlo, Florida.

History

In January 1988 to finish building the new station, Press sold WMOD to Blackstar Broadcasting (an HSN sister company). That February, the station began to run HSN programming full-time (except for a few hours of religious and public affairs shows on Sunday mornings) and its call letters were changed to WBSF. Its barter cartoons and other barter shows moved to WAYK (channel 56, now Ion Television owned-and-operated station WOPX-TV). Finally, UHF channel 68 went on the air as WKCF at 6 a.m. on December 10, 1988. It first aired an analog signal from studios located at a strip mall on Adanson Street in Orlando. The channel's early programming lineup consisted mostly of shows that had previously been seen on WMOD until January. The shows were originally a blend of cartoons, classic sitcoms, recent sitcoms, older movies, and drama series. The station provided a city-grade signal to Orlando and a Grade B signal to Daytona Beach and Melbourne. WKCF was branded on-air as "TV 68".

The station eventually moved from the strip mall to new facilities located on Courtland Street in Orlando. Press Broadcasting wanted to move WKCF's transmitter to the Christmas/Bithlo tower farm in order to improve its signal in the other two major cities in the market, Daytona Beach and Melbourne. However, the company soon discovered that as long as WKCF transmitted on channel 68, it could not move its transmitter to Bithlo and still reach Clermont with a city-grade signal. In 1991, Press Broadcasting approached Brevard Community College about swapping channels with its educational station, WRES. Under this plan, both stations would move their transmitters to Bithlo. At the time, WRES was a relatively low-powered station serving the immediate Brevard County area on UHF channel 18. However, if that station moved to Bithlo, it would be able to boost its power to the maximum five million watts. The college agreed and the Federal Communications Commission (FCC) approved the swap. As a result, in 1992, WKCF moved to channel 18 which was reclassified as a commercial license and WRES moved to channel 68 as well as adopting the call sign WBCC (it is now WEFS). After the switch, WKCF re-branded itself as "TV 18."

Soon after moving to channel 18, WKCF started producing a kids club program called The Buckaroo Club, hosted by Ranger Bob (aka Tim Kincaid), a talented character actor, whose popularity as Ranger Bob, made him a local legend in Rochester, New York where he hosted the first version of the kid's program, The Circle B Club, produced by Jan Shaw. The Buckaroo Club was very popular and garnered high ratings, pulling a 35 share, surpassing shows like Oprah in the same time slot. It seemed most people in Central Florida knew who Ranger Bob was; due to many live appearances throughout Central Florida. The Buckaroo Club was as popular with college aged and young adults as it was with kids and families. The show was on the air from 1992 to 1994; a reunion program aired on WKCF in 2004. Tim Kincaid also created a popular late night monster movie series called Friday Night with the Grave Master, the tongue-in-cheek series features classic monster movies hosted by the Grave Master. This tremendously funny series was hugely popular with college aged fans across Central Florida. Jim King was the Production Designer of the series, and helped create the show's content. Jim King was also the designer of the prized Friday Night with the Grave Master T-shirt which could only be won by viewers of the series. Another move that put increased the station's profile in the market was a partnership with the Orlando Magic to broadcast many of the NBA team's road games; it gradually added some home games as well, this was right around the time Shaquille O'Neal put the Magic on the map. In 1994, the station was rebranded as "18 WKCF". The station joined The WB on January 11, 1995, as a charter affiliate. A year after it affiliated with the network, the station rebranded itself as "WB 18". For most of The WB's eleven-year run, WKCF was consistently the network's top affiliate. At one point, it was even the fourth-highest rated station in Central Florida.

In 1998, the studios of WKCF were moved to Lake Mary into a building that Press Broadcasting had built on an empty lot right next to the main competition, WOFL (channel 35). The station was sold to Emmis Communications in 1998 for $200 million. As the station focused more on its network commitments, it chose not to renew its contract with the Orlando Magic in 1999; the games then went to WRBW (channel 65). From 2001 to 2005, the WKCF studios in Lake Mary served as a centralcasting hub for Emmis' television stations. Using Florical Automation, the company was responsible for master control operations for several Emmis owned Fox and WB affiliates in the Southeastern United States including WVUE in New Orleans, WALA-TV and WBPG (now WFNA) in Mobile, Alabama, and WFTX in Fort Myers. From WKCF's facilities, Emmis maintained broadcast capabilities during several major hurricane impacts on several of its stations including Katrina (affecting WVUE), Ivan (affecting WALA), and Charley (affecting WFTX and WKCF). The Emmis model was later discontinued as the company sold off the stations.

On January 24, 2006, CBS Corporation and the Warner Bros. unit of Time Warner announced that UPN and The WB would cease broadcasting, to be replaced by a new network that would feature some of the higher-rated programs from both networks called The CW Television Network. On March 1, Emmis officials confirmed that WKCF would become the Orlando affiliate of The CW. The station had been the obvious choice as the market's CW affiliate in any case, as network officials were on record as preferring the "strongest" stations among The WB and UPN's affiliates, and WKCF had been The WB's strongest affiliate for virtually all of the network's run. On May 8, Emmis announced the sale of WKCF to what was then known as Hearst-Argyle Television for $217.5 million. The sale was finalized on August 31. This created the third duopoly in the Orlando market joining the Cox-owned duopoly of WFTV and WRDQ, and the Fox Television Stations-owned duopoly of WOFL and WRBW. As part of the move, WKCF moved its operations to the WESH facilities in Winter Park. It may now take on the responsibility of airing NBC programs when WESH is not able to so such as in the event of extended breaking news or severe weather coverage, special programming, or other scheduling conflicts.

Until October 2008, WKCF was the only Hearst-owned station whose website was not powered by Internet Broadcasting. That changed when Hearst and Internet Broadcasting created a separate page for the station within WESH's web address. On January 22, 2009, a tube in WKCF's analog transmitter failed forcing the station to transmit its analog signal at a reduced three megawatts power (which was sixty percent of its authorized five megawatt ERP) under special temporary authority from the FCC. The station had applied to cease analog transmissions on the original February 17, 2009, date of the digital transition, but its application was rejected by the FCC.

On July 9, 2012, Hearst Television entered into a dispute with Time Warner Cable and Bright House Networks, leading to WKCF being pulled from Bright House and being temporarily replaced with the TV Guide Network; WKCF's subchannels were also similarly pulled and replaced with alternate programming. The substitution of TV Guide Network in place of WKCF lasted until July 19, 2012, when a new carriage deal was reached between Hearst and Time Warner.

News operation

Although not in a traditional big three network affiliate time period, Orlando has been very competitive in the 10p.m. prime time slot over the years. WKCF was the first television station in the area to launch a prime time newscast. This effort was established in 1991 through a news share agreement with WCPX (now WKMG). Eventually, future sister station WESH would take over production duties of WKCF's broadcast. Meanwhile, in 1995, WFTV entered into the 10p.m. news race with its own program on WRBW, which in 2000 moved to sister station WRDQ, where it remains today. Then in 1998, WOFL premiered the first half-hour independently-produced newscast outside of Orlando's big three network outlets; this program would be expanded to an hour on weeknights in the fall of 1999.

The first WESH-produced newscast for WKCF was cancelled in September 2002, due to increased competition from WOFL and WRDQ. From August 2004 to 2007, WKCF's studios were home to the nationally syndicated morning show The Daily Buzz, which would be seen on the station each weekday from 6 to 9a.m. until its cancellation in 2015. After Hearst bought the station in 2007, the show moved its production to Disney's Hollywood Studios, while the program moved locally to WRDQ.

When WESH became a sister station to WKCF, it led to speculation channel 2 would bring back a 10p.m. newscast to the station at some point. In January 2007, WESH began producing a two-hour extension of its weekday morning newscast on WKCF. This joined two other morning news broadcasts airing at the same time on WOFL (established in September 2000) and WRDQ (launched at the same time as WKCF's morning show). A simulcast of the 6a.m. hour of WESH's weekday morning newscast would subsequently be added to the station. On November 1, 2007, WESH began broadcasting its local newscasts in high definition, with the WKCF newscasts included in the upgrade. After a seven-year hiatus, WKCF resumed a nightly 10p.m. newscast produced by WESH on August 31, 2009. As of January 2015, the 5a.m. hour of WESH's weekday morning newscast is now simulcast on WKCF.

Technical information

Subchannels
The station's digital signal is multiplexed:

During the George Zimmerman trial in 2013, WKCF's second digital subchannel, in addition to its then-This TV affiliation, was used to carry NBC Daytime and WESH's daytime syndicated programming to accommodate trial coverage on WESH. Hearst's contract with This TV's then-parent company Tribune Broadcasting ran out at the end of 2017, and WKCF-DT2 switched to carrying programming from Justice Network (now True Crime Network) on January 1, 2018.

Analog-to-digital conversion
WKCF ended programming on its analog signal, on UHF channel 18, on June 12, 2009, as part of the federally mandated transition from analog to digital television. The station's digital signal continued to broadcasts on its pre-transition UHF channel 17. Through the use of PSIP, digital television receivers display the station's virtual channel as its former UHF analog channel 18.

WKCF was one of three stations in the Orlando area (along with WKMG-TV and WOFL) to participate in the "Analog Nightlight" program, which lasted until WKCF's analog transmitter was shut down permanently on July 12, 2009.

References

External links

Orlando.ThisTV.com - This TV Orlando website
EstrellaTVOrlando.com - Estrella TV Orlando website

Television channels and stations established in 1988
The CW affiliates
True Crime Network affiliates
Estrella TV affiliates
KCF
Hearst Television
1988 establishments in Florida